William Emerson Arnett (born May 4, 1970) is a Canadian actor, comedian and producer. He is best known for his roles as Gob Bluth in the Fox/Netflix series Arrested Development (2003–2006, 2013, 2018–2019) and as the titular character in the Netflix series BoJack Horseman (2014–2020). He has appeared in films such as Let's Go to Prison (2006), Blades of Glory (2007), Semi-Pro (2008), G-Force (2009), Jonah Hex (2010), Teenage Mutant Ninja Turtles (2014) and its sequel Teenage Mutant Ninja Turtles: Out of the Shadows (2016), and Show Dogs (2018).

His deep baritone voice has landed him numerous voice acting jobs, including Danny Phantom (2004–2007), Ice Age: The Meltdown (2006), Ratatouille (2007), Horton Hears a Who! (2008), Monsters vs. Aliens (2009), Despicable Me (2010), The Nut Job (2014), Teen Titans Go! To the Movies (2018), Dolittle (2020), Rumble (2021), Chip 'n Dale: Rescue Rangers (2022) and as Batman in the Lego Movie franchise. 

Arnett has received seven Primetime Emmy Award nominations for his work in Arrested Development, 30 Rock, and BoJack Horseman. Since 2020 he has hosted the Fox reality series Lego Masters. Since July 2020, he has co-hosted the comedy podcast SmartLess alongside Sean Hayes and Jason Bateman. In 2022, he starred in a six-part improvised comedy series Murderville on Netflix.

Early life
Arnett was born in Toronto, Ontario, the son of Edith Alexandra "Alix" (Palk) and Emerson James "Jim" Arnett, who was a corporate lawyer and brewer, among other occupations. His parents were originally from Winnipeg, Manitoba, and he has roots on both sides of his family in Manitoba going back many generations. Arnett has two older sisters and a younger brother. His father, a graduate of Harvard University and a corporate lawyer, served as the president and CEO of Molson Breweries from 1997 to 2000.

Arnett briefly attended Lakefield College School in Lakefield, Ontario, but was asked not to return after a semester for being a troublemaker. The Subway Academy II allowed him to take theatre classes at the Tarragon Theatre. He eventually graduated from Leaside High School and attended Concordia University, Montreal for a semester but dropped out. As a teenager, he was encouraged by his mother to pursue an acting career. He auditioned for commercials in Toronto and enjoyed acting. In 1990, he moved to New York City to study acting at the Lee Strasberg Theatre and Film Institute. He appeared in plays in New York, and his first acting role was in Felicity Huffman's independent film Erie, which was filmed on the Erie Canal. As mentioned on the SmartLess podcast, Arnett is an avid hockey fan and work out enthusiast, known to often boast about his “Pro Dumper” and ability to bench press as much as 165 pounds.

Career

Acting 
In February 1996, Arnett made his first television pilot with Kevin Pollak and his wife Lucy Webb for CBS, that was not picked up. In 1999, Arnett was in another pilot for The Mike O'Malley Show on NBC as the protagonist's friend Jimmy. The show was picked up, but it was cancelled after two episodes. Arnett has referred to 2000, the year after that show was cancelled, as "the darkest year of [his] life", and he admits that he "didn't get a lot of work" and "drank those years away". In summer 2000, a friend helped pull Arnett out of his battle with alcoholism, and he began to get his career back on track.

In 2001, Arnett was cast in the CBS television pilot, Loomis as the slacker brother of a local news reporter (Cheri Oteri), that was not picked up. In 2002, Arnett was cast in a fourth television pilot which was for the CBS sitcom Still Standing, which was picked up and ran for several seasons, but his character was cut from the series after the pilot. Arnett became so frustrated, after his fourth failed pilot, that he "swore off pilots" altogether, until his agent persuaded him to audition for the pilot for Arrested Development.

In 2003, Arnett found mainstream success in television when he played George Oscar "Gob" Bluth II in the Fox comedy series Arrested Development and in 2006 he was nominated for his first Emmy. The show was cancelled after three seasons due to low ratings, despite its critical acclaim and cult following. He played Max the Magician in Sesame Street, in a nod to Gob Bluth's penchant for using Europe's "The Final Countdown" during his magic shows. According to a 2006 interview with the Los Angeles Times, Arnett's two favourite episodes of the show were "Pier Pressure" and "Afternoon Delight". His exposure on Arrested Development led to a number of larger roles in feature films. Though having worked in drama, his role for Arrested Development is still comedy, and he often portrays smug antagonists. He "never considered himself a comic" and considers himself an "actor first".

In 2002, prior to Arrested Development, Arnett guest-starred in The Sopranos and Law & Order: Special Victims Unit. In 2006, Arnett starred in his first leading role in Let's Go to Prison, directed by Bob Odenkirk. It earned more than US$4 million at the box office and more than US$13 million in rentals. In Blades of Glory, Arnett and his then-wife Amy Poehler played brother/sister ice-skating pair with an incestuous relationship. The film was No. 1 at the U.S. box office during its first two weeks, and grossed approximately US$118 million domestically during its theatrical run. and US$36 million on home video. He guest-starred in King of the Hill and 30 Rock, in which he was nominated for four Emmy Awards for Outstanding Guest Actor in a Comedy Series.

Arnett played supporting roles in the films Spring Breakdown, Hot Rod, The Comebacks, and On Broadway, where he once again worked with his close friend and director Dave McLaughlin. In The Brothers Solomon, he again teamed with Odenkirk and starred with Saturday Night Live member Will Forte. He appeared in a major supporting role in the basketball comedy Semi-Pro, his second film with Ferrell. He plays Lou Redwood, the commentator of the team, who is "a former player, a bit of a womanizer, and a boozer". On November 17, 2009, it was announced that Arnett would try to win over real-life wife Amy Poehler in a guest spot on Parks and Recreation. Arnett played Chris, an MRI technician and possible love interest for Poehler's Leslie Knope. Justin Theroux appeared in the same episode as yet another suitor. Arnett signed on for one episode, and the episode entitled "The Set Up" aired January 14, 2010.

He starred in Running Wilde which was cancelled in January 2011, due to poor ratings as well as The Increasingly Poor Decisions of Todd Margaret with David Cross. On March 23, 2011, Arnett appeared in the penultimate episode to The Office season 7. Arnett co-starred in the NBC television comedy series Up All Night, about a couple who struggle to balance their home lives (especially with their newborn child) and their work ones.

He had been attached to play the lead role of David Miller in the 2013 comedy We're the Millers, but had to pass due to scheduling; the part went to Jason Sudeikis. He co-starred as Vern Fenwick in the 2014 film Teenage Mutant Ninja Turtles and its 2016 sequel, Teenage Mutant Ninja Turtles: Out of the Shadows. Arnett starred in the CBS sitcom The Millers, which lasted for two seasons.

In 2017, Arnett was cast in the recurring role of Mr. Quagmire on the Netflix comedy drama series A Series of Unfortunate Events.

Voice-over work 
Arnett's distinctive gravelly voice has earned him voice-over work for CBS television promos, film trailers and numerous advertisements, including Lamisil medication. Perhaps most recognizable is Arnett's voice saying, "It's not more than you need, just more than you're used to" in ads for GMC trucks. He has lent his voice to a number of television shows, such as Ghost Writer in the 2005 Nickelodeon's series Danny Phantom, Duncan Schiesst for the Comedy Central animated program Freak Show, which was created by and stars the voice of his Arrested Development co-star David Cross. Arnett was the announcer for the faux trailer "Don't" in the 2007 film Grindhouse, and became announcer for Cartoon Network in October 2008 during its "Noods" era, replacing Greg Cipes.

He has voiced characters in animated films, including Vlad in Horton Hears a Who!, The Missing Link in Monsters vs. Aliens, Horst the German sous-chef in Ratatouille and Mr. Perkins in Despicable Me. He planned to be the voice of the K.I.T.T. in Universal's Knight Rider, a sequel to the popular 1980s television series. The production featured a Ford Mustang as K.I.T.T. Since Arnett had a previous long standing relationship with competitor automaker General Motors as the voice for GMC Trucks commercials, GM asked Arnett to pull out of the project. Arnett opted to withdraw from the project and he was replaced by Val Kilmer. Arnett made a commercial cameo for the video game Call of Duty: Modern Warfare 2.

In 2009, he voiced the title character in Eat Lead: The Return of Matt Hazard, a video game developed by Vicious Cycle Software and starred as an out of work former video game protagonist hoping to make a comeback, versus a greedy game executive played by Neil Patrick Harris. In the Fox animated comedy series Sit Down, Shut Up, he voiced Ennis Hofftard, a bodybuilder who teaches English and always attempts to chase women. The show premiered on April 19, 2009, but was eventually cancelled after several months due to poor ratings. It aired its last episode on November 21, 2009.

Arnett lent his voice to Batman in the film The Lego Movie. Arnett reprised the role in The Lego Batman Movie, a spin-off of The Lego Movie released in 2017 as well as The Lego Movie 2: The Second Part, released in 2019. He reprises the role in an episode of the franchise's spinoff animated series Unikitty! titled "BatKitty", which aired days before the release of the film.

He voiced the eponymous character in the critically acclaimed Netflix animated sitcom BoJack Horseman, which ran from 2014 to 2020.

In 2021, Arnett played The Facts of Lifes Dink Lockwood in a reenactment of the third season episode "Kids Can Be Cruel" for the third edition of Live in Front of a Studio Audience. He was cast to replace Armie Hammer in Next Goal Wins.

Other work 
He is the spokesman of a series of Hulu advertisements and his role in television spots deliberately recalls Devon Banks as a power-hungry manipulator. In July 2020, Arnett, along with Bateman and Sean Hayes, created a comedy and talk podcast called SmartLess.

Producing 
In 2010, Arnett and former Arrested Development co-star Jason Bateman created DumbDumb Productions, a production company focusing on digital content. Their first video was "Prom Date", the first in a series of "Dirty shorts" for Orbit.

In March 2012, Mansome, Arnett's first executive-producer credit with Bateman, was announced as a Spotlight selection for the Tribeca Film Festival. The documentary, directed by Morgan Spurlock, is a comedic look at male identity as it is defined through men's grooming habits featuring celebrity and expert commentary.

In 2016, he co-created, co-wrote and starred in the Netflix original series Flaked, which received negative reviews from critics.

Cursed Friends, a Comedy Central original movie from Arnett's production company Electric Avenue, was announced in September 2022. Arnett is set to make an appearance in the film.

Personal life
Arnett lives in Los Angeles, California, and is a dual citizen of Canada and the United States. He moved to Venice in 2000 and lived there for 17 years. In 2015, Arnett bought property in Beverly Hills and began construction on a new home, which was completed in 2017. In 2021, he sold the custom home and moved to a modern farmhouse in Benedict Canyon.

Arnett has been married twice and has three children. 

He was married to Penelope Ann Miller for a brief period between 1994 and 1995. The two began dating in 1993 and married a year later in December 1994. They divorced less than a month later in January 1995.

Arnett was married to Amy Poehler from 2003 to 2016. The two appeared together in four episodes of Arrested Development, one episode of Parks and Recreation, and the films Blades of Glory, Horton Hears a Who!, On Broadway, Spring Breakdown, Monsters vs. Aliens and the Disney American English dubbing of The Secret World of Arrietty. 

Arnett began dating Amy Poehler in 2000, several years after their initial encounter in 1996 when he saw her in an Upright Citizens Brigade performance. Arnett and Poehler married on August 29, 2003, and had two sons together. The first son was born on October 25, 2008 and their second son was born in August 2010. Arnett and Poehler separated amicably in September 2012. In April 2014, Arnett filed for divorce, citing irreconcilable differences. Their divorce was finalized in July 2016.

In 2013, Los Angeles–based Arnett began dating chef Katie Lee, who was living in New York City; the relationship ended after a couple of months. In December 2013, Arnett began dating Erin David, a long-time friend and producer who worked on his series Up All Night. 

Arnett began a relationship with socialite and business woman Alessandra Brawn in 2019. Arnett and Brawn have one child together, who was born on May 27, 2020.

Arnett has struggled with alcoholism in the past, a topic explored in his shows Flaked and BoJack Horseman. He managed to achieve sobriety for fifteen years until a relapse during the production of Flaked.

Arnett lists Steve Martin and Chevy Chase as his two biggest comedic influences. He is an avid follower of his hometown teams, including the Toronto Maple Leafs, Toronto FC, Toronto Blue Jays, Toronto Argonauts and Toronto Raptors.

Honors
In 2005, New York magazine named Arnett and then-wife Poehler "New Yorkers of the Year" during its annual New York Magazine Culture Awards. In April 2007, during a panel hosted by The Paley Center for Media, talk show host Conan O'Brien and his writing staff named Will Arnett as one of their three all-time favourite guests, sharing the honour with fellow Canadians Norm Macdonald and Harland Williams. Also in April 2007, Entertainment Weekly named Will Arnett a "Future King of Comedy." In May 2007, Best Week Ever ranked Arnett No. 9 on its "Top 15 Sexiest Nerd Boys" poll. In July 2007, Premiere magazine named Arnett one of "The 20 Hottest New Faces in Comedy." In July 2019, Arnett was inducted into the Canada Walk of Fame.

Filmography

Film

Television

Video games

Awards and nominations

References

External links

 

1970 births
Living people
Annie Award winners
Canadian expatriate male actors in the United States
Canadian male comedians
Canadian male film actors
Canadian male television actors
Canadian male video game actors
Canadian male voice actors
Comedians from Toronto
Concordia University alumni
Lakefield College School alumni
Lee Strasberg Theatre and Film Institute alumni
Male actors from Toronto
20th-century American comedians
21st-century American comedians
20th-century Canadian comedians
21st-century Canadian comedians
20th-century American male actors
21st-century American male actors
20th-century Canadian male actors
21st-century Canadian male actors